This Is the End of Control is the debut studio album by American rock band Hey Violet, then known as Cherri Bomb. It was released on May 15, 2012 by Hollywood Records. Prior to the album's release, the song "Shake the Ground" was featured on The Avengers soundtrack. The album features the song "Let It Go" from the 2011 EP Stark. The album peaked at 24 on Billboards Top Hard Rock Albums and at 11 on Top Heatseekers.

Background and recording
Guitarist Miranda Miller described writing the album as an "extremely creative" process done by the four band members and their producers. She said they wrote so many songs, that it became difficult to decide which ones to include on the album. Miller cited the band being new to recording as the most difficult part. Describing the members as perfectionists, she said they had to learn when to stop.

The title, This Is the End of Control, is a lyric from the band's song "Shake the Ground". Lead guitarist and vocalist Julia Pierce said it is a message of empowerment, meaning, that even though the members are minors, they plan to make the decisions that are best for them; "As teenagers, as a band that really doesn't fit the mold, we don't want people trying to control us or tell us to be something that we're not."

Reception

In her review for AllMusic, Heather Phares declared "This Is the End of Control proves that Cherri Bomb is a straight-ahead rock band with talent, a rarity in the 2010s no matter how old or what sex the people in the band are". She concluded by calling the album an "impressive debut" and "while the band's talent should guard against them being treated like a novelty, the most rebellious move the women of Cherri Bomb may make is just being who they are". Writing for Girls' Life, Rachael Ellenbogen wrote that in a music industry full of "pop princesses and auto-tuned maniacs", This Is the End of Control is "a breath of fresh, angst-infused air" with songs that stand out. Brian Giffin of Loud Magazine Australia commented that "Cherri Bomb have been attracting all the right kinds of attention, and much of it has even been for all the right reasons". He describes the album as "a punchy collection of exuberant and catchy tunes that should bring a smile to the face of even the most cynical" and compliments the hooks the band writes. He concludes by calling the album a "pretty solid debut".

Zachary Houle of PopMatters rated the album a 6/10, calling the album "decent enough, with no real surprises and the odd clanger in the lyrics department here and there".

Track listing

Personnel
Cherri Bomb
Julia Pierce – lead guitar, backing vocals, co-lead vocals on tracks 1 & 3, lead vocals on tracks 2, 4–6, 9 & 10
Miranda Miller – guitar, keyboards, backing vocals, co-lead vocals on track 1, lead vocals on track 11
Rena Lovelis – bass guitar, backing vocals, co-lead vocals on track 3, lead vocals on tracks 8 & 12
Nia Lovelis – drums, backing vocals, lead vocals on track 7

Production
Red Decibel (Adam Watts, Andy Dodd and Gannin Arnold) – producer
Bobby Huff – producer on "Heart is a Hole"
Noah Lifschey – additional production on "Let It Go"
Chris Lord-Alge – mixing
Adam Watts – mixing on "Take This Now"
Neal Avron – mixing on "Let It Go"
Ted Jensen – mastering

Charts

Notes

References

External links

2012 debut albums
Hollywood Records albums
Hard rock albums by American artists
Alternative rock albums by American artists